Poignant is a surname. Notable people with the surname include: 

Axel Poignant (1906–1986), Australian photographer
Bernard Poignant (born 1945), French politician, Member of the European Parliament
Jan Poignant (born 1941), Swedish sports shooter
Roslyn Poignant (1927–2019), Australian photographic anthropologist 
Serge Poignant (born 1947), French politician, member of the National Assembly